Gadiyaram Ramakrishna Sarma (6th March, 1919 - 25th July, 2006) was a Telugu writer, Sanskrit scholar, researcher, reformist and historian. Sarma won the Kendra Sahitya Academy Award in Telugu for the Year 2007 for his autobiography: Satapatram ("A Hundred Petals").
In his Hundred Petals, Sarma devoted very little space to write about himself but penned what he had seen during his nine-decade-long life. His autobiography emerged as an authentic work on contemporary social, political and cultural conditions. Sarma presented his Hundred Petals to his wife Kammalamma with a word of praise for her patience.

Early life
Sarma was born on 6 March 1919 in a traditional Telugu Brahmin family in Anantapur district and later migrated to Alampur in Mahabubnagar district in his childhood along with his family and made the historical town his home.

Works
Sarma produced nearly 37 books, including many on the historical backgrounds of temples.
Madhava Vidyaranya Charita (which was later translated into Kannada)
Hindu Dharmam
Alampura Kshethra Mahatyam
Copper Plate of Vinayaditya at Pallepadu
Keyurabahu Charitra
Vignana Vallari
Mana Vaastu Sampada

Preservation advocacy
He devoted half of his life for the revival of Jogulamba temple at Alampur, which was in ruins and fought for construction of flood protection wall to save the historic temple complex.

Awards
Sarma was posthumously (died 25 July 2006) awarded Kendra Sahitya Academy Award in Telugu for the Year 2007 for his autobiography- SATAPATRAMULU(A Hundred Petals).

References

External links
 Review on the book Satapatram

1919 births
2006 deaths
Telugu writers
Recipients of the Sahitya Akademi Award in Telugu